Skyrocket may refer to:

 Bottle rockets, sometimes referred to as "skyrockets" (noun)
 Skyrocket, a common name for the flowering plant Ipomopsis aggregata 
 Grumman XF5F Skyrocket, an airplane
 Skyrocket (character), a fictional superhero
 Douglas D-558-2 Skyrocket, another airplane
 Skyrocket!, a band from Austin, Texas featuring Johnny Goudie and Trish Murphy